Kalyvia (Greek: Καλύβια) may refer to several villages in Greece:

Kalyvia, Aetolia-Acarnania, a village in Aetolia-Acarnania
Kalyvia, Euboea, a village in Euboea
Kalyvia, Heraklion, a village in the Heraklion regional unit
Kalyvia, Laconia, a village in Laconia
Kalyvia, Larissa, a village in Larissa
Kalyvia, Messenia, a village in Messenia
Kalyvia, Pella, a village in the Pella regional unit
Kalyvia, Skiathos, a village on the island of Skiathos
Kalyvia Analipseos, a village in the Larissa regional unit
Kalyvia Ilidos, a village in Elis, part of Amaliada
Kalyvia Myrtountion, a village in Elis, part of Vartholomio
Kalyvia Thorikou, a municipality in East Attica
Megala Kalyvia, a municipality in the Trikala regional unit